Willard "Ramblin'" Thomas (1901 or 1902 – 1944 or 1945) was an American country blues singer, guitarist and songwriter. He is best remembered for his slide guitar playing and for several recordings he made in the late 1920s and early 1930s. Blues scholars seem undecided if his nickname referred to his style of playing or to his itinerant nature. He was the brother of the blues musician Jesse Thomas.

Biography
Thomas was born in Logansport, Louisiana, one of nine children in his family. His father played the fiddle, and Willard and his brothers Joe L. and Jesse learned to play the guitar, with Willard particularly practicing slide guitar techniques.

Thomas relocated to Deep Ellum, Dallas, Texas, in the late 1920s and was influenced by the playing of Lonnie Johnson, Blind Lemon Jefferson and Blind Blake. He performed in San Antonio, Oklahoma and possibly St. Louis, Missouri, in his subsequent travels. He recorded in Dallas and Chicago between 1928 and 1932, for Paramount Records and Victor Records. His playing is said to have influenced Black Ace and Robert Johnson.

Thomas reportedly died of tuberculosis in 1944 or 1945 in Memphis, Tennessee.

Compilations of his work have been released on CD by various record companies, including Document Records, in addition to LPs previously issued by Heritage, Biograph, and Matchbox Records.

Discography
Ramblin' Mind Blues: Chicago Blues, 1928
Complete Recorded Works 1928–1932 in Chronological Order, Ramblin' Thomas and the Dallas Blues Singers, compilation album (Document, 1992)

His known recorded songs are the following:
"So Lonesome"
"Hard to Rule Woman Blues"
"Lock and Key Blues"
"Sawmill Moan"
"No Baby Blues"
"Ramblin' Mind Blues"
"No Job Blues"
"Back Gnawing Blues"
"Jig Head Blues"
"Hard Dallas Blues" (take 2)
"Hard Dallas Blues" (take 4)
"Ramblin' Man"
"Poor Boy Blues"
"Good Time Blues"
"New Way of Living Blues"
"Ground Hog Blues"
"Shake It Gal"
"Ground Hog Blues No. 2"
"Little Old Mama Blues".

See also
List of country blues musicians
List of Texas blues musicians

References

External links
Illustrated discography at Wirz.de

1900s births
1945 deaths
People from Logansport, Louisiana
American blues guitarists
American male guitarists
American blues singers
Songwriters from Louisiana
Country blues musicians
20th-century deaths from tuberculosis
Blues musicians from Louisiana
Slide guitarists
Texas blues musicians
Paramount Records artists
20th-century American singers
20th-century American guitarists
Songwriters from Texas
Singers from Louisiana
Guitarists from Louisiana
Guitarists from Texas
20th-century American male singers
Tuberculosis deaths in Tennessee
American male songwriters